Joensen is a surname that may refer to:
Bodil Joensen, (1944–1985), Danish pornographic actress
Edmund Joensen, (b. 1944), Faroese politician
Hallur Joensen, Faroese country singer
Heri Joensen, Faroese musician
Meinhard Joensen, Faroese soccer player
Ove Joensen, (1948–1987), Faroese seaman and adventurer
Pál Joensen, (b. 1990), Faroese elite swimmer
Páll Mohr Joensen, Faroese soccer player
Poul F. Joensen, (1898-1970), Faroese poet
William Michael Joensen, (b. 1960), Bishop of the Catholic Diocese of Des Moines, USA
Rannva Joensen, (b. 1986), Faroese former child star and singer

Joensen is the most common surname in the Faroe Islands. As of 1 January 2015 the number of people in the Faroe Islands with the surname Joensen was 2 365.

See also
Sámal Joensen-Mikines,(1906–1979), Faroese painter

References 

Patronymic surnames